The Durban Moment refers to the period in the early 1970s when the South African city of Durban became the centre of a new vibrancy in the struggle against apartheid. The two central figures in this moment were Steve Biko and Richard Turner – the former was closely associated with the Black Consciousness Movement and the latter with the trade union movement. The two were in a reading group together. Both were influenced by the new left and had links to radical Christian circles.

References

External links
 
 
 
 Rick Turner, SA History Online

Culture of Durban
Opposition to apartheid in South Africa
History of South Africa
Politics of South Africa